Benegas may refer to:

Domingo Benegas (born 1946), Paraguayan footballer
Ismael Benegas (born 1987), Paraguayan footballer
José María Benegas (1948–2015), Spanish politician
Albino Jara Benegas (1877–1912), provisional President of Paraguay
Perris Benegas (born 1995), American BMX cyclist
Treaty of Benegas, a peace treaty during the Argentine Civil War
Willie Benegas, American mountaineer